U.S. Coast Guard Air Station San Diego (CGAS San Diego) is a Coast Guard Air Station based in San Diego, California, United States, across the street from San Diego International Airport. CGAS San Diego operates three MH-60T Jayhawk helicopters off the Coast Guard ramp.

CGAS San Diego is also adjacent to Sector San Diego which houses two 41-foot Utility Boats, two  USCG rigid hull inflatable boats (RHIB's), one  RB-HS and three  RB-S. Being implemented are two  Special Purpose Craft-Law Enforcement (SPC-LE), which are  USCG vessels used for maritime Law Enforcement. The  SPC-LE's have three  Mercury Marine engines along with some of the most advanced electronics systems in existence. Also at the station are two  USCG Coastal Patrol Boats.  The air station is physically separated from the rest of the airfield, such that USCG fixed-wing aircraft must cross a busy, 6-lane city street to reach the runway; street light activation opens the locked gates to the airfield and the air station, and also stops traffic while aircraft are traversing the street.

History

Lindbergh Field opened on October 16, 1934, on the Pacific Highway. The San Diego International Airport East Terminal opened on March 6, 1967, and the West Terminal opened July 11, 1979. A new Commuter Terminal opened July 23, 1996. It is self-contained, full service facility with four gates used by seven commuter airlines to handle 25,000 passengers each day. Construction of the expansion of the West Terminal ended in November, 1997. Almost 14 million passengers travel through Lindbergh Field each year. The 27 passenger and cargo airlines operate more than 500 flights each day from the runways.

On December 11, 1935, negotiations between the City of San Diego and the U.S. Government were concluded which provided  of tideland for the construction of a Coast Guard Air Station adjacent to Lindbergh Field, the municipal airport. This project had the strong support of many people and agencies, and particularly the Harbor Commission and Department of San Diego and the Chamber of Commerce. The area for this station was deeded to the Coast Guard at no cost, after approval by citizens of San Diego, at a municipal election held in April 1935.

Construction of the Air Station was undertaken in 1936 with funds provided by the Federal Public Works Administration. The M.H. Golden Co. was the contractor. The area had to be dredged from the bay and filled and brought up to grade level. Long piles were driven in the soil at the building sites for stabilization. The contract called for one hangar with lean-to, a mess hall, a barracks building, two aprons, a runway to the field, and a small wooden seaplane ramp. During and prior to this time a Coast Guard Air Detachment was maintained on Lindbergh Field in one-half of a commercial hangar. This detachment was led by Elmer F. Stone after May 21, 1935. Stone is one of Coast Guard Aviation's most colorful figures.

In April 1937, the Air Station was commissioned. The first commanding officer was LT S.C. Linholm, who later became Commander of Eleventh Coast Guard District. There had, however, been an Air Patrol Detachment active in San Diego between 1934 and 1937. At the time this was the only Coast Guard air base in California.

Coast Guard Air Station San Diego saw no radical changes as a result of the declaration of war in 1941. The unit continued to watch and report the activities of fishing boats in the area, to provide assistance in cases of distress, and to provide transportation by air for other government departments. Air Sea Rescue operations were given primary focus from October 1943 on. Between January 1 and December 1, 1944, a total of 124 aircraft went down in waters covered by this unit. Of the 201 pilots and crewmen involved, 137 were saved, 59 were killed outright by mid-air collisions or impact with the water, two are missing, and three who might have been saved were lost because of improper equipment or the failure to locate them promptly.

In June 1972, a major rebuilding plan was proposed. On January 26, 1983, a ceremony was held signaling the completion of the project.

In April 1997, the Port of San Diego began a master plan for San Diego International Airport. The goal of the plan is to provide incremental, cost-effective improvements to SDIA to meet the region's near-term demand for air service while a long-term regional air transportation strategy is developed in collaboration with the San Diego Association of Governments (SANDAG) and other transportation agencies.

External links
 HH-65 Air Stations

United States Coast Guard Air Stations
Buildings and structures in San Diego
Military in San Diego
Military facilities in San Diego County, California
Military installations in California
San Diego International Airport
1937 establishments in California